North Harford High School is located in Pylesville, Maryland, United States. It is one of the few schools in Harford County, Maryland to have an FFA Chapter, and the only school in Harford County to have a barn with a semi-working farm on campus. North Harford finished undergoing renovations and additions at the beginning of the 2008 school year. Its re-dedication ceremony was held on April 13, 2008, in the new auditorium.

Student Government
North Harford's student government program is one of the most active in Harford County. Currently, North Harford's SGA is a member of both the Harford County Regional Association of Student Councils, and the Maryland Association of Student Councils. North Harford is allotted nine votes in the Harford County Regional Association of Student Councils.

North Harford's SGA is made up of an executive board, individual Class Boards that report to the executive board, and forum representatives elected from every English class.

Events sponsored by the SGA include the Homecoming Dance, holiday food drives, Quarterly General Assemblies, Red Cross Blood Drives, an annual School Beautification Day, HCRASC General Assemblies.

The Student Government Association is the primary vehicle of communication between the student body and the administration at North Harford High School. In addition to sponsoring events and acting as a liaison between the students and administration, the SGA allocates money to all clubs and organization needing funds for the school year. Student organizations can apply for funds via the executive board president or treasurer. Some organizations receiving funds for the 2007–2008 school year include the Spirit Club, the Science Department, the Student of the Month Program, and several others.

Major Clubs

Envirothon
In the 2009 competition, North Harford's B-team placed 3rd for B-teams and 7th overall. In 2010, North Harford's team won the presentation portion of the competition. The A-team placed 7th and the B-team placed 4th. In the 2015 5th topic presentation North Harford won 1st place beating the reigning 9-year champions Harford Christian. Also in the competition, the A-team placed 2nd and the B-team placed 3rd.

Academic Team
The Academic Team competes yearly in several competitions including on the CBS show “It’s Academic” against other local high schools and in the Hartford County Academic Tournament, in which the team reached the finals in 2012.

NHHS Jazz Band
In past years, the band has performed for WJZ-13's "It's Academic" program.  They have also played at the Lincoln-Regan Dinner. The Jazz Band has also played for the Harford County Public Library for the Christmas Holidays.   Every once in while, the Jazz Band holds coffee houses right in the newly constructed band room. The Jazz Band is led by the band teacher, Mr. Wacyk.

Natural Resources and Agricultural Science Magnet Program

The Natural Resources and Agricultural Sciences Magnet Program (NRAS)is located at North Harford High School.

The Natural Resources and Agricultural Sciences Magnet (NRAS) is composed of four clusters focusing on Small Animal Science, Large Animal / Equine Sciences, Plant Sciences, or Natural Resources Sciences. Programs provide students with the opportunity to experience challenging coursework and experience science and technology with emphasis on career development and real world application. The Harford County Agricultural Economic Advisory Board, the University of Maryland, Harford Community College, and Harford County Public Schools has partnered to develop a program where each cluster will provide students with the quality background knowledge, and skills necessary for continued education or to gain entry into their work based field of choice.

Students will have the opportunity to earn college credits and various industry level certifications while still in high school. All students will learn geospatial applications and may earn nationally recognized certification through NASA. In the senior year, students will take part in a capstone project. This will occur either in a work based environment, a school-based practical learning activity, or an off-site research activity with a mentor. The capstone is based on the student's areas of interest and future goals.

Athletics
Baseball

-2008 record: 16–5

-ranked #10 in the state by The Baltimore Sun high school baseball poll

-Regional Champions: 1999, 2000, 2005

Football

-2010 record (Varsity): Lost One Game

-2010 record (JV): Undefeated

-2009 record (JV): Undefeated.

-2007 record: 10–2, The hawks were led once again by Dan Griffin.

-2006 record: 8–3, The Hawks made the playoffs for the second consecutive year.

Softball
JV 2009: 7–2

Varsity 2005: Reached the regional championship game where they suffered a loss against Easton High School.

"Basketball"
Women's Varsity helped teacher Lin James to her 500th career win in 2004

Women's Varsity coach, Lin James, reached her 600th career game on December 10, 2012, in her 46th season.

Soccer

1985 – Harford County and regional champions. State semi-finalists. Ranked 12th in State of Maryland.

1992, 1994 – State semi-finalists.

References

Harford County Public Schools
Educational institutions established in 1950
Public high schools in Maryland
1950 establishments in Maryland